Amós Acero Pérez (31 March 1893 – 16 May 1941) was Spanish Socialist Workers' Party politician under the Second Spanish Republic. He was born in Villaseca de la Sagra as the 3rd of 7 children. After the victory of the Nationalist faction in the Spanish Civil War, he was arrested by the new authorities. Following an investigation of his past by the Brigada Político-Social, he was brought to trial and was executed by the government of Francisco Franco in Madrid.

See also
List of people executed by Francoist Spain

References

External links
Ficha de Amós Acero en la web del Congreso de los Diputados. 
 Carta última de Amós Acero a su familia

1893 births
1941 deaths
Alcaldes of the Second Spanish Republic
People executed by Francoist Spain
Spanish Socialist Workers' Party politicians
Members of the Congress of Deputies of the Second Spanish Republic